Evelyn Ashamallah is a female Coptic painter, born in Desouk, Kafr el-Sheikh, Egypt in 1948 to Ashamallah Eskandar Hanna and Elaine Mikhail Hanna.

She graduated from the faculty of fine arts at Alexandria University in 1973 and married an Egyptian Journalist, Mahmoud Youssry and they have two sons. During the 1980s she lived in Algeria for a few years with her husband. She has three brothers. In 2000 she worked as the manager of the Egyptian Museum for Contemporary Art until she resigned in 2002.

Ashmallah's artistic approach has moved from natural landscapes to abstract portraits and plants. She has used various media, including oil, wax, and acrylic.

Ashamallah had her 22nd art exhibition in 2005. Her style is now known for its playfulness, and the evoking of magic fictitious legend where each painting tells a story.

See also
 List of prominent Copts

References

External links
 Evelyn Ashamallah family website
 Cairo Times article, April 2003

1948 births
Living people
20th-century Egyptian women artists
21st-century Egyptian women artists
Egyptian people of Coptic descent
Coptic painters
Egyptian painters
Egyptian women painters
People from Desouk
Alexandria University alumni